Port Augusta is a small city in South Australia. The suburb of Port Augusta West is located on the west side of the gulf on the Eyre Peninsula. Other major industries included, up until the mid-2010s, electricity generation. At June 2018, the estimated urban population was 13,799, having declined at an average annual rate of -0.53% over the preceding five years.

Description
The city consists of an urban area extending along the Augusta and Eyre Highways from the coastal plain on the west side of the Flinders Ranges in the east across Spencer Gulf to Eyre Peninsula in the west. The urban area consists of the suburbs, from east to west, of Port Augusta and Davenport (on the eastern side of Spencer Gulf), and Port Augusta West on the Eyre Peninsula.

History
Port Augusta is part of the NukunuBarngarla Aboriginal country. Its original Barngarla name is Goordnada.

It is a natural harbour, which was proclaimed on 24 May 1852 by Alexander Elder (brother of Thomas Elder) and John Grainger, having discovered it while aboard the Government schooner Yatala, captained by Edward Dowsett. The port was named after Augusta Sophia, Lady Young, the wife of the Governor of South Australia, Sir Henry Edward Fox Young. Lady Young was the daughter of Charles Marryat Snr., who had been a slaveholder in the British West Indies. Her brother was the Anglican minister Dean of Adelaide Charles Marryat.

Flora and fauna 
Marine species include resident species and migrating visitors. Occasional sightings are made of whales, sunfish, swordfish and turtles.

Demographics
According to the 2016 Census, the population of the Port Augusta census area was 12,896 people, making it the third largest urban area after Whyalla and Port Lincoln on the Eyre Peninsula. 49.3% of the population were female, 83.7% are Australian born and 19.2% were Aboriginal.

The most popular industries for employment were Technicians and Trades Workers (16%), Community and Personal Service Workers (15.4%) and Clerical and Administrative Workers (13.8%), while the unemployment rate is approximately 7%. The median weekly household income is A$789 or more per week, compared with $924 in Adelaide. 17.4% of the population identify themselves as Catholic, while a higher 26.2% identify with no religion at all.

Transport
Spencer Gulf is a natural barrier to land transport, so Port Augusta has naturally become the "crossroads of Australia". It is at the junction of major road and rail links.

Road
Port Augusta is located at the eastern end of the Eyre Highway to Perth and at the northern end of the Augusta Highway to Adelaide. It is situated at the southern end of the Stuart Highway to Darwin. Virtually all road traffic across southern Australia passes through Port Augusta and over the Joy Baluch AM Bridge across the top of Spencer Gulf.

Rail

This  narrow gauge railway was later taken over by the Commonwealth in 1910 and later renamed the Central Australia Railway. In 1929, it was extended to its last terminus at Alice Springs.

This was built to standard gauge as part of a long term plan to harmonise gauges between the mainland states, causing a break-of-gauge at Port Augusta until the standard gauge track was extended to Port Pirie in 1937.

The standard gauge Adelaide-Darwin railway was finally completed in 2003. Port Augusta is a stop on the Indian Pacific transcontinental train service on the Sydney–Perth railway and on The Ghan service between Adelaide, Alice Springs and Darwin. One service a week for each train in each direction serve the station.

In the 1990s, the narrow gauge line between Port Augusta and Quorn was re-opened as the Pichi Richi Heritage Railway.

Aviation
Port Augusta is served by Port Augusta Airport. Sharp Airlines used to connect the city to Adelaide twice daily, however this service ceased to operate on 31 May 2017.

Climate

Port Augusta experiences a hot desert climate (Köppen: BWh, Trewartha: BWal);  with hot, dry summers; mild to warm, dry springs and autumns; and mild, dry winters. However, some authors define it as semi-arid steppe climate (BSk). In terms of vegetation the same is given as desert, although counterintuitively the city maintains with governmental aid with some plants adapted to aridity. Considered desert also by the city hall. A record high temperature of 49.5 °C was recorded on 24 January 2019. The city is sunny, where it features 142.1 clear days annually.

Economy

Electricity generation
From the mid-1920s, the town was supplied with direct current electricity, which changed to alternating current in 1948.

Electricity was generated at the Playford B (240 MW) and Northern power stations (520 MW) from brown coal mined at Leigh Creek, 250 km to the north. The only coal-fired electricity generating plants in South Australia, in 2009 they produced 33% of the state's electricity, but over 50% of the state's CO2 emissions from electricity generation.

Playford B has not been operational since 2012. In October 2015, Alinta Energy announced the permanent closure of both Northern and Playford B in early 2016, following which the Northern Power Station went offline on 9 May 2016.

In 2016, a local community group was lobbying for assistance to replace the coal-fired plants with a solar thermal power station. The premier of South Australia, Jay Weatherill announced on 14 August 2017 that construction would commence in 2018 and was expected to be completed in 2020. The Aurora Solar Thermal Power Project is expected to cost  to build, including a  loan from the Federal Government, and deliver 150MW of electricity. SolarReserve has a contract to supply all of the electricity required by the state government's offices from this power project.

Arid-zone horticulture 
Separately, Sundrop Farms has a combined solar power tower, greenhouse and desalination plant which is used to produce tomatoes near the old power station site. It opened in October 2016 and produces 39MW of thermal energy from over 23000 mirrors and a  tower, used for heating, electricity, and desalination to irrigate tomatoes in greenhouses. Sundrop has a 10-year contract to supply Coles Supermarkets with at least 15,000 tonnes of truss tomatoes per year.

Tourism 
Port Augusta has been able to capitalise on the growing eco-tourism industry due to its proximity to the Flinders Ranges. The Pichi Richi Railway is a major drawcard, connecting Port Augusta to Quorn via the Pichi Richi Pass.

Within Port Augusta is the City of Port Augusta's Wadlata Outback Centre, providing tourists with an introduction to life in the Australian outback. The centre recorded over 500,000 visitors in 2006.
North of the town, on the Stuart Highway, is the Australian Arid Lands Botanic Garden, a unique and award-winning garden, opened in 1996, which "showcases a diverse collection of arid zone habitats in a picturesque setting of more than 250 hectares". The gardens have a cafe/restaurant with views across the saltbush plains to the escarpment of the Flinders Ranges. The PACC annual report shows more than 100,000 people visited the gardens in 2006.

Southwest of town is the El-Alamein army base.

Proposed multi-commodity port 
In February 2019, the site of the former Playford power stations was sold by Alinta Energy to Cu-River Mining as a prospective port development site. The company intends to construct a transshipment facility suitable for the export of iron ore, wheat and other commodities.

Media
The major publication of the town is The Transcontinental, a weekly newspaper that was first issued in October 1914, and whose office is located on Commercial Road. In 1971, a brief experiment, known as the Northern Observer (7 July – 30 August 1971), occurred when The Transcontinental and The Recorder from Port Pirie were published under a combined title in Port Pirie.

Historically, the town also published the Dispatch (1877–1916), which, as was common at the time, evolved through a series of name changes: Port Augusta Dispatch (18 August 1877 – 6 August 1880); Port Augusta Dispatch and Flinders' Advertiser (13 August 1880 – 17 October 1884); Port Augusta Dispatch (20 October 1884 – 16 March 1885); and, Port Augusta Dispatch, Newcastle and Flinders Chronicle (18 March 1885 – 21 April 1916). For a short period, due to the short-lived discovery of gold at Teetulpa, a sister publication Teetulpa News and Golden Age (1886–1887) was also printed by the Dispatch.

Another publication. the Port Augusta and Stirling Illustrated News (1901) was also printed briefly in the town by James Taylor, but was stopped so he could focus on his printing business.

Education

There are six public primary schools:
Augusta Park Primary School,
Carlton R-9 School,
Flinders View Primary School,
Port Augusta West Primary School,
Stirling North Primary School and
Willsden Primary School.

There is one secondary school, Port Augusta Secondary School, located on Stirling Road. There is one private school for reception to year 12 students called Caritas College.

Port Augusta also has:
Port Augusta Special School,
OAC:Port Augusta School of the Air
The University of Adelaide and
TAFE (tertiary technical college), Port Augusta Campus.

Politics

State and federal

Since the 2020 redistribution, Port Augusta was split between the state electoral district of Stuart and electoral district of Giles. In federal politics, the city is part of the division of Grey, and has been represented by Liberal MP Rowan Ramsey since 2007. Grey is held with a margin of 8.86% and is considered safe-liberal. The results shown are from the largest polling station in Port Augusta – which is located at Port Augusta TAFE college.

Local
Port Augusta is in the City of Port Augusta local government area. The City of Port Augusta is believed to have had the longest serving mayor in Australia, Joy Baluch, who died after 30 years of service on 14 May 2013. The council is based at the Port Augusta Civic Centre; prior to 1983, it operated out of the now-disused Port Augusta Town Hall.

Heritage listings
Port Augusta has a number of heritage-listed sites, including:
 Beauchamp Lane: Port Augusta Waterworks
 Beauchamp Lane: Beatton Memorial Drinking Fountain
 Beauchamp Lane: Gladstone Square Bandstand
 9 Church Street: St Augustine's Anglican Church, Port Augusta
 Commercial Road: Old Port Augusta railway station
 52 Commercial Road: Port Augusta Institute
 54 Commercial Road: Port Augusta Town Hall
 34 Flinders Terrace: Port Augusta School of the Air
 1 Jervois Street: Port Augusta Courthouse
 Stirling Street: Port Augusta railway station
 off Tassie Street: Port Augusta Wharf
 12 Tassie Street: Bank of South Australia, Port Augusta

See also
 Point Paterson Desalination Plant
 The Sundowners (1960), partly filmed on location in Port Augusta
 List of extreme temperatures in Australia

References

External links 

 Big Stories, Small Towns – Online documentary featuring video, photos, digital stories and archival film from Port Augusta

 
1852 establishments in Australia
Coastal cities in Australia
Coastal towns in South Australia
Eyre Peninsula
Far North (South Australia)
Populated places established in 1852
Port cities in South Australia
Spencer Gulf
Trans-Australian Railway